Sí, mi amor is a 2020 Peruvian romantic comedy film directed by Pedro Flores Maldonado and written by Maldonado & Yiddá Eslava.

Synopsis 
A shocked boyfriend faces a fidelity test after his partner ends the relationship, as he strongly suspects that he is cheating on her. It is a story of love conflicts, a plot that has as protagonists a couple of boyfriends who are destabilized by social pressure, jealousy and mistrust. They will try to start from scratch and with new partners, but how much can you run from your true feelings?

Cast 
The actors participating in this film are:

 Yiddá Eslava as Bea
 Julián Zucchi as Guille
 Andrés Salas as Max
 Magdyel Ugaz as Ceci
 Pietro Sibille as Alejandro
 Saskia Bernaola as Marisol
 Sebastián Monteghirfo as Horacio
 Mayra Couto as Avril
 Santiago Suárez as Checo
 Ximena Palomino as Britany

Release 
The film premiered on January 23, 2020 in Peruvian theaters. Then it was acquired by Netflix and premiered on May 6 of the same year.

Reception 
The film brought in 33,000 viewers on its first day, and 30,000 on its second day. It ended its first weekend with more than 150,000 viewers, to finish with more than 350,000 viewers at the end of the year.

Sequel 
In 2021, a sequel titled ¿Nos casamos? Sí, mi amor (We married? Yes, my love) was announced, premiering on February 3, 2022 in Peruvian theaters.

References

External links 
 

2020 films
2020 romantic comedy films
2020s Peruvian films
2020s Spanish-language films
Films set in Peru
Films shot in Peru
Peruvian romantic comedy films
Wallaz Producciones films